The 2021–22 Stephen F. Austin Lumberjacks basketball team represented Stephen F. Austin State University (SFA) during the 2021–22 NCAA Division I men's basketball season. The Lumberjacks, led by sixth-year head coach Kyle Keller, played their home games at the William R. Johnson Coliseum in Nacogdoches, Texas.  This season was the Lumberjacks' first as members of the Western Athletic Conference; SFA was one of four schools, all from Texas, that left the Southland Conference in July 2021 joining the WAC.

Previous season
The Lumberjacks finished the 2020–21 season 16–5, 12–3 in Southland Conference play to finish in fourth place. They did not participate in the Southland tournament due to a postseason ban for low APR scores. This season was the Lumberjacks' last as members of the Southland Conference, as they joined the Western Athletic Conference for the 2021–22 season.

Roster

Schedule 

|-
!colspan=12 style=| Non-conference Regular season

|-
!colspan=12 style=| WAC Conference season

|-
!colspan=9 style=|WAC tournament

|-
!colspan=9 style=|CBI

Source:

See also 
 2021–22 Stephen F. Austin Ladyjacks basketball team

References 

Stephen F. Austin
Stephen F. Austin Lumberjacks basketball seasons
Stephen F. Austin Lumberjacks basketball
Stephen F. Austin Lumberjacks basketball
Stephen F. Austin